Nowdeh-e Khaleseh (also Romanized as Nowdeh-e Khāleşeh) is a village in Lajran Rural District, in the Central District of Garmsar County, Semnan Province, Iran. At the 2006 census, its population was 814, in 238 families.

References 

Populated places in Garmsar County